Line 1 or 1 line may refer to:

Public transport

Africa
 Line 1 (Algiers Metro), Algeria
 Cairo Metro Line 1, Egypt

Asia

China
 Line 1 (Beijing Subway)
 Line 1 (Changchun Rail Transit)
 Line 1 (Changsha Metro)
 Line 1 (Changzhou Metro)
 Line 1 (Chengdu Metro)
 Line 1 (Chengdu Tram) (planned)
 Line 1 (Chongqing Rail Transit)
 Line 1 (Dalian Metro)
 Line 1 (Dongguan Rail Transit)
 Line 1 (Foshan Metro) or Guangfo Metro
 Line 1 (Fuzhou Metro)
 Line 1 (Guangzhou Huangpu Tram)
 Line 1 (Guangzhou Metro)
 Line 1 (Guilin Rail Transit) (under construction)
 Line 1 (Guiyang Metro)
 Line 1 (Hangzhou Metro)
 Line 1 (Harbin Metro)
 Line 1 (Hefei Metro)
 Line 1 (Hohhot Metro)
 Line 1 (Jinan Metro)
 Line 1 (Kunming Metro)
 Line 1 (Lanzhou Metro)
 Line 1 (Luoyang Subway)
 Line 1 (Nanchang Metro)
 Line 1 (Nanhai Tram)
 Line 1 (Nanjing Metro)
 Line 1 (Nanning Metro)
 Line 1 (Nantong Metro)
 Line 1 (Ningbo Rail Transit)
 Line 1 (Qingdao Metro)
 Line 1 (Shanghai Metro)
 Line 1 (Shaoxing Metro)
 Line 1 (Shenyang Metro)
 Line 1 (Shenzhen Metro)
 Line 1 (Shijiazhuang Metro)
 Line 1 (Suzhou Rail Transit)
 Line 1 (Taiyuan Metro) (under construction)
 Line 1 (Tianjin Metro)
 Line 1 (Ürümqi Metro)
 Line 1 (Wuhan Metro)
 Line 1 (Wuhu Rail Transit)
 Line 1 (Wuxi Metro)
 Line 1 (Xi'an Metro)
 Line 1 (Xiamen Metro)
 Line 1 (Xuzhou Metro)
 Line 1 (Zhengzhou Metro)

India
 Line 1 (Chennai Metro) or Blue Line
 Line 1 (Delhi Metro) or Red Line
 Line 1 (Lucknow Metro) or Red Line
 Line 1 (Mumbai Metro)
 Line 1 (Mumbai Monorail)
 Line 1 (Nagpur Metro) or Orange Line
 Line 1 (Navi Mumbai Metro)
 Line 1 (Pune Metro) or Purple Line
 Kolkata Metro Line 1

Japan
 Line 1 (Hiroshima Rapid Transit) or Astram Line
 Line 1 (Nagoya Municipal Subway) or Higashiyama Line
 Line 1 (Osaka Metro) or Midōsuji Line
 Kūkō Line (Fukuoka City Subway)
 Toei Asakusa Line, Tokyo

South Korea
 Busan Metro Line 1
 Daegu Metro Line 1
 Daejeon Metro Line 1
 Gwangju Metro Line 1
 Incheon Subway Line 1
 Seoul Subway Line 1

Other places in Asia
 Line 1 (Yerevan Metro), Armenia
 Line 01 (Phnom Penh Bus Rapid Transit), Cambodia
 Tehran Metro Line 1, Iran
 Line 1 (Almaty Metro), Kazakhstan
 Seremban Line, Malaysia
 LRT Line 1 (Metro Manila), Philippines
 Line 1 (Doha Metro) or Red Line, Qatar
 Line 1 (Singapore), a service of the East West MRT Line
 Wenhu Line, Taipei, Taiwan

Australia
 Line 1 (Sydney Light rail network) or Inner West Light Rail, New South Wales
 Line 1 (Sydney Trains) or North Shore & Western Line, New South Wales

Europe

France
 Île-de-France tramway Line 1, Paris
 Paris Métro Line 1

Germany
 U1 (Berlin U-Bahn)
 U1 (Frankfurt U-Bahn)
 U1 (Hamburg U-Bahn)
 U1 (Munich U-Bahn)
 U1 (Nuremberg U-Bahn)

Greece
 Line 1 (Athens Metro)
 Line 1 (Thessaloniki Metro)

Italy
 Line 1 (Naples Metro)
 Milan Metro Line 1

Russia
 Line 1 (Moscow Metro) or Sokolnicheskaya line
 Line 1 (Nizhny Novgorod Metro)
 Line 1 (Saint Petersburg Metro)

Spain
 Line 1 (Bilbao metro)
 Line 1 (Granada Metro)
 Line 1 (Madrid Metro)
 Line 1 (Madrid Light Metro)
 Line 1 (Metrovalencia)
 Barcelona Metro line 1
 Seville Metro line 1

Ukraine
 Line 1 (Kharkiv Metro), Ukraine
 Line 1 (Kyiv Metro) or Sviatoshynsko–Brovarska line

Other places in Europe
 U1 (Vienna U-Bahn), Austria
 Line 1 (Minsk Metro) or Maskoŭskaja line, Belarus
 Brussels Metro line 1, Belgium
 M1 (Copenhagen Metro), Denmark
 Metro Line M1 (Budapest Metro), Hungary
 M1 (Warsaw), Poland
 Bucharest Metro Line M1, Romania

North America

Canada
 Line 1 (O-Train) or Confederation Line, Ottawa, Ontario
 Line 1 Yonge–University, Toronto, Ontario
 Green Line (Montreal Metro), formerly Line 1, Quebec

Mexico
 Metrorrey Line 1, Monterrey
 Mexico City Metro Line 1
 Mexico City Metrobús Line 1

United States
 Tempo (bus rapid transit), Line 1T, Oakland, California
 Route 1 (MTA Maryland)
 1 (New York City Subway service), New York
 1 Line (Sound Transit), Seattle, Washington

Other places in North America
 Line 1 (Havana Suburban Railway), Cuba
 Line 1 (Santo Domingo Metro), Dominican Republic
 Line 1 (Panama Metro)

South America

Brazil
 Line 1 (Baixada Santista LRT), São Paulo
 Line 1 (Rio de Janeiro)
 Line 1 (Rio LRT)
 Line 1 (São Paulo Metro)

Other places in South America
 Santiago Metro Line 1, Chile
 Line 1 (Metrovía), Guayaquil, Ecuador
 Line 1 (Lima Metro), Peru

Other uses
 A "one-line whip", an application of a Whip in politics
 LINE 1 (a.k.a. L1), a non-LTR retrotransposon and the only Long INterspersed Element (LINE) active in the human genome

See also
 1 Train (disambiguation)
 First Line (disambiguation)
 One Line (disambiguation)